The ruisseau L'Abbé (English: L'Abbé stream) is a freshwater tributary of the Pikauba River, flowing in the unorganized territory of Lac-Ministuk, in the Le Fjord-du-Saguenay Regional County Municipality, in the administrative region of Saguenay–Lac-Saint-Jean, in province, in Quebec, to Canada.

The upper part of the ruisseau L’Abbé valley is accessible by route 169; other secondary forest roads have been developed in the sector for forestry and recreational tourism activities .

Forestry is the primary economic activity in the sector; recreational tourism, second.

The surface of L’Abbé Creek is usually frozen from late November to early April, however safe circulation on the ice is generally from mid-December to late March.

Geography 
The main watersheds adjacent to ruisseau L’Abbé are:
 north side: Galbraith stream, Moïse lake, rivière aux Sables, Kenogami Lake, Saguenay River, Vert Lake (Hébertville);
 east side: Pikauba River, Patrie Creek, McDonald Creek, Gagnon Creek, Cyriac River, Chicoutimi River;
 south side: Luppanay stream, Pikauba River, rivière aux Écorces, Petite rivière Pikauba;
 west side: Pikauba River, Belle Rivière stream, La Belle Rivière, Couchepaganiche East River, Métabetchouane River.

L’Abbé stream rises from a very small unidentified lake on the eastern flank of Mont Hudon-Beaulieu. The northern mouth of this head lake is located at:
  south of Vert Lake (Hébertville);
  south-east of lac Saint-Jean;
  south-west of Kenogami Lake;
  north-west of route 169;
  south-west of the confluence of ruisseau L’Abbé and Pikauba River.

Upper stream of ruisseau L’Abbé (segment of )
  north-east, up to a bend in the river;
  towards the east by collecting the discharge (coming from the northeast) of the Florian lake and the discharge (coming from the southwest) of the lake of Écluse, until the discharge (from the northwest) of Brulé and Sarcelle lakes;
  south-east in a deep valley, until the discharge (coming from the south) of a set of lakes including Lac à la Tranche, lac à Brod and lac Beaver;
  east to Luppanay stream (coming from the south);

Lower stream of ruisseau L’Abbé (segment of )

  northward curving northeast, to the outlet (coming from the northwest) of Lake Moses;
  east, curving south, to Galbraith Creek (coming from the north);
  southeasterly, up to Plessis stream (coming from the southwest) which drains Lac Glacé, Lac Ratté and Lac Plessis;
  east in a deep valley, to the outlet (coming from the south) of Lake Robertson;
  north-east in a deep valley, to its mouth.

L’Abbé stream flows into a bend on the west bank of the Pikauba River. This confluence is located at:
  south-west of the village center of Saint-Cyriac;
  west of the confluence of the Pikauba river and Kenogami Lake;
  south-west of the barrage de Portage-des-Roches;
  west of Highway 169;
  south-west of the confluence of the Chicoutimi River and the Saguenay River;
  south-east of the shore of lac Saint-Jean.

Toponymy 
The toponym "ruisseau L'Abbé" was formalized on December 5, 1968, at the Place Names Bank of the Commission de toponymie du Québec.

Notes and references

Appendices

Related articles 
 Le Fjord-du-Saguenay Regional County Municipality
 Lac-Ministuk, a TNO
 Pikauba River
 Kenogami Lake
 Chicoutimi River
 Saguenay River
St. Lawrence River
 List of rivers of Quebec

Rivers of Saguenay–Lac-Saint-Jean
Le Fjord-du-Saguenay Regional County Municipality